Yori Bertin (born Catherine Chassin-Briault, December 28, 1940) is a French actress known for her roles in Elevator to the Gallows (1958), The Nun (1966) and La gageure imprévue (1973).

External links 
 
 Biography (in French)
 Photo de Yori Bertin dans Ascenseur pour l'échafaud

1940 births
French television actresses
French film actresses
Living people
20th-century French actresses
People from Labourd